Bhopal may refer to:
 Bhopal, a city in India, capital of Madhya Pradesh state
 Bhopal District, a district in Madhya Pradesh, with the city of Bhopal as its headquarters
 Bhopal Division, an administrative geographical unit of Madhya Pradesh state
 Bhopal (state), the 18th century princely state in Central India
 Bhopal Agency, an administrative section of British India's Central India Agency
 Bhopal State (1949–56), in the Republic of India
 Bhopal (play), by Rahul Varma, based on the Bhopal disaster
Bhopal: A Prayer for Rain, 2014 Indian English-language historical drama film

See also
 Bhopali (disambiguation)
 Bhopal disaster, an industrial disaster that killed or injured over 560,000 victims in the city of Bhopal in December 1984
 Nawab of Bhopal, the title of the rulers of the princely state of Bhopal
 Bourbons of India, also known as the Bourbons of Bhopal, an important family in the region
 Bhopal (Lok Sabha constituency)
 Bhopalpatnam